Ukraine competed at the 2005 Winter Universiade in Innsbruck and Seefeld, Austria. Ukraine won 16 medals, four of which were gold, ranked 6th by both number of gold medals and overall number of medals.

Medallists

Figure skating

See also
 Ukraine at the 2005 Summer Universiade

References

Sources
 Archive of the official web site
 Results in cross-country skiing
 Results in figure skating
 Results in short track speed skating

Ukraine at the Winter Universiade
Winter Universiade
2005 Winter Universiade